The Italian Democratic Party of Monarchist Unity (PDIUM) was an Italian political party of conservative and monarchist goals.

History
The PDIUM was founded in 1959 as the Italian Democratic Party (Partito Democratico Italiano), a merger of the People's Monarchist Party and the National Monarchist Party. It became the PDIUM in 1961.

The new party, like its predecessors, was hampered by provisions in the Italian Constitution of 1946 making it all but impossible to restore the monarchy short of adopting a new constitution.  The document specifically forbade a referendum on changing the republican form of government, and (until 2002) barred male members of the House of Savoy from returning to Italy.  It was never able to repeat the results of its predecessors: electoral support for its monarchist cause shrank in the 1963 general election (1.8%) and in those of 1968 (1.3%), due to the successes of the Italian Liberal Party (respectively 7.0 and 5.8%).

In 1970, the party formed an alliance with the neo-fascist Italian Social Movement (MSI) known as the National Right. In 1972, PDIUM fully merged into the MSI. Alfredo Covelli, long-time monarchist leader, was elected president of MSI. In 1976 Covelli led a moderate split of MSI and established National Democracy.

A small part of the party, more tied to liberal and Risorgimento inspiration, however, refused the alliance with the political heirs of fascism and gave life to the Monarchist Alliance.

Electoral results

Italian Parliament

Notes

1959 establishments in Italy
Political parties established in 1959
Political parties disestablished in 1972
Monarchist parties in Italy
Defunct political parties in Italy
1972 disestablishments in Italy